Journal of European Public Policy is a peer-reviewed academic journal covering the study of public policy, European politics and the EU. The current joint editors-in-chief are Jeremy Richardson (University of Oxford) and Berthold Rittberger (University of Munich).

A number of the journal's special issues have been reprinted in book form.

Abstracting and indexing 
The journal is abstracted and indexed in:
 SCImago
 Web of Science

According to the Journal Citation Reports, the journal has a 2019 impact factor of 4.177, ranking it 7th out of 180 journals in the category "Political Science" and 3rd out of 48 journals in the category "Public Administration".

See also 
 List of political science journals

References

External links 
 
 Official blog.

10 times per year journals
English-language journals
Political science journals
Publications established in 1994
Taylor & Francis academic journals